Anthony Charles Lock (born 3 September 1976) is an English former footballer who played as a forward in The Football League.

Career
Lock, born in Harlow, Essex, joined the Colchester United youth team and made his debut in 1995. He spent six years with the U's, making 102 appearances and scoring 13 goals. He had two loan spells, at Chelmsford City and Kettering Town. He was released in 2001 and subsequently joined Dagenham & Redbridge, where he made 20 appearances and scored four goals. He later went on to make appearances for Grays Athletic.

Honours

Club
Colchester United
 Football League Division Three Playoff Winner (1): 1997–98

References

External links
 
 Tony Lock at Colchester United Archive Database
 

1976 births
Living people
Sportspeople from Harlow
Association football forwards
English footballers
English Football League players
Colchester United F.C. players
Chelmsford City F.C. players
Kettering Town F.C. players
Dagenham & Redbridge F.C. players
Grays Athletic F.C. players